Eirene , also Jupiter LVII and originally known as , is a retrograde irregular satellite of Jupiter. It was discovered by a team of astronomers from the University of Hawaii led by Scott S. Sheppard in 2003
but was then  lost. It was recovered in 2017 and given its permanent designation that year.

Characteristics
Eirene is about 4 kilometres in diameter, and orbits Jupiter at an average distance of 23,974,000 km in 743.88 days, at an inclination of 166° to the ecliptic (167° to Jupiter's equator), in a retrograde direction and with an eccentricity of 0.307.

It belongs to the Carme group, made up of irregular retrograde moons orbiting Jupiter at a distance ranging between 23 and 24 Gm and at an inclination of about 165°.

Name
The moon was named in 2019 after Eirene (Εἰρήνη), the daughter of Zeus and Themis and the goddess of peace in Greek mythology; the name originated from a naming contest held on Twitter with sixteen tweets suggesting the name, most significantly by users Quadrupoltensor (@Quadrupoltensor) who first suggested the name and PaulR (@PJRYYC).

References

Carme group
Moons of Jupiter
Irregular satellites
Astronomical objects discovered in 2003
Moons with a retrograde orbit